Apache ObJectRelationalBridge (OJB) is an Object/Relational mapping tool that allows transparent persistence for Java Objects against relational databases. It was released on April 6, 2005.

As of January 16, 2011 Apache ObJectRelationalBridge has been retired.

Features
OJB is  an open source project.
It is lightweight and easy to use requiring simply configure two files to implement a persistence layer.
It is easy to integrate into an existing application because it does not generate code.
It allows the use of different patterns of persistence: owner (PersistenceBroker API), JDO and Object Data Management Group  (ODMG).

Functionality
OJB uses an XML based Object/Relational mapping. The mapping resides in a dynamic MetaData layer, which can be manipulated at runtime through a simple Meta-Object-Protocol (MOP) to change the behaviour of the persistence kernel.

Configuration
At least two files are required to configure OJB:  OJB.properties and repository.xml

Allocation
For mapping a 1-1 relationship, for example, you have two tables: person and account. In this case, a person has an account and vice versa.

See also

Apache OpenJPA

References

External links
Apache ObJectRelationalBridge

OJB
OJB
Java enterprise platform
Free software programmed in Java (programming language)
Free web server software
Cross-platform free software